Turbonilla musorstom is a species of sea snail, a marine gastropod mollusk in the family Pyramidellidae, the pyrams and their allies.

The specific name musorstom is the acronym for the joint expeditions by the Muséum national d'Histoire naturelle (‘Mus.’) and the Office de la Recherche Scientifique et Technique Outre-Mer (‘Orstom’).

Description
The shell grows to a length of 3.6 mm.

Distribution
This species occurs in the Pacific Ocean off the Solomons and Fiji.

See also 
Other species with acronym names:
 AEECL's sportive lemur
 Turbonilla musorstom
 Klossiella quimrensis

References

External links
 To Encyclopedia of Life
 To World Register of Marine Species

musorstom
Gastropods described in 2010